Chapter XI of the United Nations Charter deals with non-self-governing territories.

The reference to "territories whose peoples have not yet attained a full measure of self-government" reflects the growing sense of inevitability with which the political independence of these countries was coming to be viewed. Specifically, Article 73 requires countries administering those colonies "to develop self-government, to take due account of the political aspirations of the peoples, and to assist them in the progressive development of their free political institutions." The other main goal elucidated by this chapter is the political, economical, social, and educational development of these countries. Article 74 refers to both administering countries and colonies as having similar duties to the community of nations: "Members of the United Nations also agree that their policy in respect of the territories to which this Chapter applies, no less than in respect of their metropolitan areas, must be based on the general principle of good-neighbourliness, due account being taken of the interests and well-being of the rest of the world, in social, economic, and commercial matters."

See also
United Nations list of non-self-governing territories

References

Divisions and sections of the Charter of the United Nations